Rai Bahadur Dinesh Chandra Sen (3 November 1866 – 20 November 1939) was a Bengali writer, educationist and researcher of Bengali folklore from the Indian subcontinent. He was the founding faculty member and the Ramtanu Lahiri Research Fellow of the Department of Bengali Language and Literature of the University of Calcutta. He died in Calcutta in 1939.

Early life and family
Sen was born to Ishwar Chandra Sen and Rupalata Devi, in the village of Suapur (in present-day Dhaka District, Bangladesh). His mother's family was from Bogjuri in Manikganj District. Hiralal Sen was a cousin on that side. His grandson Samar Sen was a noted Bengali poet.

Education and career
In 1882, he passed his university entrance examination from Jagannath University in Dhaka. In 1885, he passed his F.A. examination from Dhaka College. He passed his B.A. examination with Honours in English literature in 1889 as a private student. In 1891, he became the headmaster of the Victoria School in Comilla. During 1909–13, he was a Reader in the newly founded Department of Bengali Language and Literature of the University of Calcutta. In 1913, he became the Ramtanu Lahiri Research Fellow in the same department. In 1921, the University of Calcutta conferred on him the Doctorate of Literature in recognition of his work. In 1931, he received the Jagattarini gold medal for his contribution to the Bengali literature. He retired from service in 1932.

Works
He worked on collection and compilation of Bengal folklore. Along with Chandra Kumar De, he published Mymensingh Gitika (Ballads of Mymensingh), a collection of 21 ballads.

In Bengali
 Bangla Bhasa O Sahitya (1896)
 Tin Bandhu (Three Friends) (1904)
 Ramayani Katha (Tales of Ramayana) (1904)
 Behula (a folk tale) (1907)
 Sati (1907)
 Phullara (1907)
 Jada Bharat (1908)
 Sukatha (a collection of essays) (1912)
 Grihashri (1916)
 Nilmanik (1918)
 Mukta Churi (1920)
 Saral Bangla Sahitya (1922)
 Vaidik Bharat (Vedic India: based on stories from the Vedas) (1922)
 Gharer Katha O Yugasahitya (autobiographical work) (1922)
 Aloke Andhare (1925)
 Chaukir Vidambana (1926)
 Oparer Alo (1927)
 Pauraniki (Tales from the Puranas) (1934)
 Brihat Banga (Greater Bengal: a social history) in two volumes (1935)
 Ashutosh Smriti Katha (1936)
 Shyamal O Kajjal (1936)
 Padavali Madhurya (1937)
 Puratani (1939)
 Banglar Puranari (1939)
 Prachin Bangla Sahitye Musalmaner Avadan (1940)
 Rakhaler Rajgi

In English
 History of Bengali Language and Literature (1911)
 Sati (1916)
 The Vaishnava Literature of Medieval Bengal (1917)
 Chaitanya and His Companions (1917)
 The Folk Literature of Bengal (1920)
 The Bengali Ramayana (1920)
 Bengali Prose Style, 1800-1857 (1921)
 Chaitanya and His Age (1922)
 Eastern Bengal Ballads in four volumes (1923–1932)
 Glimpses of Bengal Life (1925)

References

Indian folklorists
Bengali writers
University of Calcutta alumni
Academic staff of the University of Calcutta
1866 births
1939 deaths
Bengali Hindus
19th-century Bengalis
20th-century Bengalis
Bengali historians
Dhaka College alumni
Scholars from Kolkata
Rai Bahadurs
20th-century Indian scholars
20th-century Indian historians
20th-century Indian educational theorists
20th-century Indian male writers
20th-century Indian educators
Bengali educators
Indian academics
Indian folk-song collectors

People from Dhaka